Kyiv International Institute of Sociology, or KIIS (КМІС), is a Ukrainian organization conducting sociological research in the fields of social and socioeconomic research, marketing research, political research, health studies, and research consulting and auditing.

Methods 
In its projects, KIIS uses the following research methods:
 traditional interviews
 computer assisted interviews
 telephone surveys
 Internet surveys
 postal surveys
 street surveys
 tracking research
 panel studies
 interviews at places where products are sold and services delivered
 exit-polls
 covert consumer
 retail sales and service delivery audit
 measuring flows of people and transport
 in-depth interviews
 brainstorming
 expert surveys
 hall-tests
 ethnographic methods
 content analysis
 desk research
 INPOLL online research

KIIS runs an Omnibus survey on a regular basis.

KIIS supports an open research Data Bank with the online key word search that is updated on a regular basis. Besides commissioned research, KIIS specialists conduct original academic research. KIIS Archive contains a collection of national and international publications by KIIS experts. KIIS published a number of  books and research manuals. Since 2011, KIIS has been publishing its own journal «KIIS Review».

Structure 
While 40 employees work at the central KIIS office, KIIS also has representative offices in major cities of Ukraine. A team of KIIS interviewers is based at each regional center, with their total number exceeding 500 people. Ten focus group moderators work at KIIS Kyiv and regional offices. KIIS has a focus group research center and a computer-assisted telephone interviewing (CATI) center.

Senior management 
 KIIS President – Valeriy Khmelko, doctor of philosophical sciences, professor
 KIIS General Director – Volodymyr Paniotto, doctor of philosophical sciences, professor
 KIIS executive director – Natalia Kharchenko, PhD
 KIIS Financial Director – Volodymyr Khmelko

History 
The Kyiv International Institute of Sociology (KIIS) was founded in 1990 as a research center of the Sociological Association of Ukraine. In 1992, a partnership was established with the Paragon Research International and thus the research center became a Ukrainian-American research company under the name of KIIS. In 1995, KIIS joined ESOMAR (European Society for Opinion and Marketing Research).

External links 
 Official site

Research institutes in Ukraine
Sociological research companies of Ukraine